A Soldier's Heart is a Philippine action drama television series broadcast by Kapamilya Channel. Directed by Richard V. Somes, it stars Gerald Anderson, Carlo Aquino, Vin Abrenica, Elmo Magalona, Jerome Ponce, Yves Flores, Nash Aguas, Sue Ramirez and Sid Lucero. The series aired on ABS-CBN's Primetime Bida evening block and worldwide via The Filipino Channel from January 20 to September 25, 2020, replacing The Killer Bride and was replaced by Walang Hanggang Paalam.

Synopsis
The series primarily focuses on the soldiers of the 4th Infantry Division of the Philippine Army and their actions during combat. Through multiple perspectives, the story focuses on these soldiers, mainly: Alex Marasigan (Gerald Anderson), an IT expert who quits his desk job and joins because just like his brother, he wants to serve the country, Abraham "Abe" Kamlun (Carlo Aquino), a Tausug Muslim man, who, despite his family's opposition of the move, joins the Army nonetheless, and Michael Mendoza (Nash Aguas), a boy who joins the Army to provide for his family.

The series also focuses on their Moro separatist adversaries, led by Saal Alhuraji (Sid Lucero), also known by his nom de guerre Abdul Waajid, who seeks to avenge his father who was killed by the military.

Cast and characters

 Main cast
 Gerald Anderson as Pfc. Alexander "Alex" Marasigan, PA / Hakeem Alhuraji
 Carlo Aquino as Sgt. Abraham "Abe" Kamlun, PA 
 Vin Abrenica as Capt. Elmer Marasigan, PA 
 Elmo Magalona as Capt. Jethro Mondejar, PA 
 Yves Flores as 2nd Lt. Benjamin "Benjie" Arguelles, PA 
 Jerome Ponce as 2nd Lt. Philip "Phil" Panganiban, PA 
 Nash Aguas as Sgt. Michael "Striker" Mendoza, PA 
 Sue Ramirez as Capt. Lourdes "Lourd" Bacalso, PA 
 Sid Lucero as Saal Alhuraji/Abdul Waajid

 Supporting cast
 Ariel Rivera as BGen. Victor C. Mondejar, AFP
 Rommel Padilla as BGen. Dante G. Marasigan†, AFP
 Irma Adlawan as Yasmin Alhuraji/Amarah Alhuraji
 Raymond Bagatsing as Col. Melicio Adriano, PA 
 Mickey Ferriols as Minda Marasigan  
 Mon Confiado as Lt. Col. Raul R. Lucente, PA 
 Nikki Valdez as Fatima Alhuraji
 Matt Evans as Rasheed Ahmad
 Nor Domingo as Col. Virgilio I. Fontiveros, PA 
 Angelo Ilagan as Pvt. Gregorio "Gorio" Salud
 Isay Alvarez as Maysam Kamlun
 Jun Hidalgo as Ahmed Kamlun
 Claire Ruiz as Grace Valderama
 Royce Cabrera as Pvt. Andy Alfonso, PA 
 Acey Aguilar as Pvt. Jacob Cornejo, PA 
 Patrick Quiroz/Francis Magundayao as Amir Majul 
 Charlie Dizon as Isabel Gezali

Guest cast
 John Vincent Servilla as Chino Villaverde
 Richard Quan as Gov. Amer Gezali
 Sammie Rimando as Chloe Gezali
 Elora Espano/Shaira Opsimar as Aaliyah Abad
 Levi Ignacio as Cong. Shamal Shakiri
 Ketchup Eusebio as Cpl. Olan Arguelles, PA 
 Lito Pimentel as Yosef Alhuraji
 Teroy de Guzman as Abdul Waajid
 Minco Fabregas as Jamal Kamlun
 Dionne Monsanto as Atty. Odessa Mariano

Broadcast
The series airs on ABS-CBN's Primetime Bida evening block and worldwide on The Filipino Channel.

On March 16, 2020, despite having already canned its episodes, the show suspended it's airings and its production was put on hiatus due to the 2020 Luzon enhanced community quarantine in response to the COVID-19 pandemic in the Philippines. Its timeslot was temporarily filled by Wildflower, iWant Originals and Tubig at Langis.

Thereafter, the show's future would be placed in doubt after the temporary closure of ABS-CBN following the cease and desist order issued by the National Telecommunications Commission on account of its franchise expiration. However, on June 4, 2020, it was announced that the show would make its return on June 15, 2020, with a brand new season on cable-and-satellite channel Kapamilya Channel.

Reruns
A Soldier's Heart is currently re-aired internationally based on YouTube feed Kapamilya Online Live since November 1, 2022, replacing Magpahanggang Wakas.

The series re-aired on January 2, 2023 on Kapamilya Channel and A2Z under Kapamilya Gold afternoon block replacing the re-runs of Be My Lady.

Reception

Ratings

Controversies

Depiction of Butuan
The show came under fire early in the show's run for its perceived "unrealistic" and "offensive" depiction of Butuan. The scene in question was from the show's pilot episode showing the bombing of a market in the city. In a statement, Agusan del Norte 1st District Representative Lawrence Fortun  asked ABS-CBN “to immediately air an appropriate disclaimer, review and reconsider the content and story elements of the teleserye in order not to further besmirch the reputation of our historic city.”

ABS-CBN, for its part, apologized on January 23, 2020. Its statement read:  “ABS-CBN would like to apologize to Agusan Del Norte Rep. Lawrence Fortun and the people of Butuan City if the scenes in the TV series ‘A Soldier’s Heart’ have offended them. While the incident portrayed in the series was fictitious, there was mention of the city name.”

“We would like to assure them that there was no deliberate intention to portray Butuan negatively in the show. We acknowledge that Butuan is one of the most beautiful and peaceful cities in the country,” it added.

On January 24, 2020, ABS-CBN executives headed by Cory Vidanes and Laurenti Dyogi met with Fortun to further clear the issue. After said meeting, Fortun noted that aside from airing specific disclaimers, ABS-CBN has removed all production elements, scenes, and references that may be offensive to Butuan.

Side Story 
On August 19, 2021, RCD Narrative announced on their Twitter account that they will produce the BL side story Philjie’s Heart

See also
 List of programs broadcast by ABS-CBN
 List of programs broadcast by Kapamilya Channel
 List of programs broadcast by Kapamilya Online Live
 List of ABS-CBN drama series

References

External links

ABS-CBN drama series
Philippine action television series
Philippine military television series
2020 Philippine television series debuts
2020 Philippine television series endings
Filipino-language television shows
Television shows set in the Philippines
Television productions suspended due to the COVID-19 pandemic